John C. Porter may refer to:
 John Clinton Porter (1871–1959), U.S. political figure and Mayor of Los Angeles
 John Porter (ice hockey) (1904–1997), Canadian ice hockey player